The European Parliament election of 1984 took place on 17 June 1984.

Christian Democracy was the largest party in Veneto with 44.8%, while the Italian Communist Party came distant second with 23.0%

Results

Source: Regional Council of Veneto

Elections in Veneto
1984 elections in Italy
European Parliament elections in Italy
1984 European Parliament election